Zoila rosselli is a species of sea snail, a cowry, a marine gastropod mollusk in the family Cypraeidae, the cowries.

Description

Distribution
South-western Australia.

References

External links

Cypraeidae